Paul Welsh (September 11, 1911 - August 29, 2004) was an American philosopher and professor of philosophy at Duke University. 
He was a member of Phi Beta Kappa and is known for his works on logic.

Books
 Introduction to logic, Romane Clark and Paul Welsh, D. Van Nostrana Company, Inc., Princeton, N.J., Toronto, New York, London, 1962
 Fact, Value, and Perception: Essays in Honor of Charles A. Baylis, Duke University Press 1975

References

20th-century American philosophers
Philosophy academics
1911 births
2004 deaths
Cornell University alumni
Cornell University faculty
Duke University faculty
University of Iowa faculty
Bowdoin College alumni